5th New York Film Critics Circle Awards
December 27, 1939

Best Film: 
 Wuthering Heights 
The 5th New York Film Critics Circle Awards, announced on 27 December 1939, honored the best filmmaking of 1939.

Winners
Best Picture:
Wuthering Heights
Runner-up – Gone with the Wind and Mr. Smith Goes to Washington
Best Actor:
James Stewart – Mr. Smith Goes to Washington
Best Actress:
Vivien Leigh – Gone with the Wind
Best Director:
John Ford – Stagecoach
Best Foreign Film:
Harvest (Regain) • France

References

External links
1939 Awards

New York Film Critics Circle Awards
New York Film Critics Circle Awards
New York Film Critics Circle Awards
New York Film Critics Circle Awards
New York Film Critics Circle Awards